The 1997 Mount Union Purple Raiders football team was an American football team that represented the University of Mount Union in the Ohio Athletic Conference (OAC) during the 1997 NCAA Division III football season. In their 12th year under head coach Larry Kehres, the Purple Raiders compiled a perfect 14–0 record, won the OAC championship, and outscored opponents by a total of 752 to 112. They qualified for the NCAA Division III playoffs and advanced to the national championship game, defeating .

Mount Union's 1997 season was part of a record 54-game winning streak that spanned four seasons, commencing on September 14, 1996, and continuing through December 6, 1998.

The team played its home games at Mount Union Stadium in Alliance, Ohio.

Schedule

References

Mount Union
Mount Union Purple Raiders football seasons
NCAA Division III Football Champions
College football undefeated seasons
Mount Union Purple Raiders football